Felice Leonardo Buscaglia (March 31, 1924 – June 12, 1998), also known as "Dr. Love", was an American author, motivational speaker, and a professor in the Department of Special Education at the University of Southern California.

Life and career
Felice Leonardo Buscaglia was born in Los Angeles, California, on March 31, 1924, into a family of Italian immigrants. He spent his early childhood in Aosta, Italy, before going back to the United States for education. He was a graduate of Theodore Roosevelt High School. Buscaglia served in the U.S. Navy during World War II; he did not see combat, but he saw its aftermath in his duties in the dental section of the military hospital, helping to reconstruct shattered faces. 
Using G.I. Bill benefits, he entered the University of Southern California, where he earned three degrees (BA 1950, MA 1954, PhD 1963) before eventually joining the faculty. 

He was the first to state and promote the concept of humanity's need for hugs: 5 to survive, 8 to maintain, and 12 to thrive.

Upon retirement, Buscaglia was named Professor at Large, one of only two such designations on campus at that time.

Student's suicide
While teaching at USC, Buscaglia was moved by a student's suicide to contemplate human disconnectedness and the meaning of life, and began a noncredit class he called Love 1A. This became the basis for his first book, titled simply Love. His dynamic speaking style was discovered by the Public Broadcasting Service  (PBS), and his televised lectures earned great popularity in the 1980s. At one point his talks, always shown during fundraising periods, were the top earners of all PBS programs. This national exposure, coupled with the heartfelt storytelling style of his books, helped make all his titles national bestsellers; five were once on the New York Times bestsellers list simultaneously.

Death
Buscaglia died of a heart attack on June 12, 1998, at his home in Glenbrook, Nevada, near Lake Tahoe, when he was 74.

In popular culture
In a May 12, 1984 Peanuts comic strip, the dog Snoopy is seen strolling towards Charlie Brown and Sally. Snoopy gives them both warm and sincere hugs. Afterwards, Charlie Brown explains their dog's actions to his puzzled sister: "You can always tell when he's been listening to Leo Buscaglia tapes."

Buscaglia's "Dr. Love" moniker, PBS lectures, and philosophy of hugs were referenced in Season 2, Episode 1 of The Americans.

In a April 22, 1991 The Far Side comic strip, a man dressed like a bullfighter awaits the charge of another man with outstretched arms.  The caption reads:  "In some remote areas of the world, the popular sport is to watch a courageous young man avoid being hugged by a Leo Buscaglia impersonator."

Bibliography
Love (1972)
Because I Am Human (1972)
The Way of the Bull (1973)
The Fall of Freddie the Leaf (1982)
Living, Loving and Learning (1982)
The Disabled and Their Parents: A Counseling Challenge (1983)
Loving Each Other (1984)
Amar a los demás (1985)
Personhood (1986)
Bus 9 to Paradise (1986)
Seven Stories of Christmas Love (1987)
A Memory for Tino (1988)
Papa My Father (1989)
Born for Love (1992)

References

External links

 Leo Buscaglia and Felice Foundation official site
 Selected Moments of the 20th Century: 1969 Leo Buscaglia teaches Love 1A at the University of Southern California
 Buscaglia at The "My Hero" Project
 "Learn the Joy of the Moment" by Leo Buscaglia, PhD
 "Loving Through Death" by Leo Buscaglia, PhD
 Obituary at USC Alumni News
 DVDs of Leo Buscaglia Public Television programs with Leo Buscaglia available

1924 births
1998 deaths
20th-century American novelists
American self-help writers
20th-century American educators
American writers of Italian descent
USC Rossier School of Education alumni
University of Southern California faculty
American male novelists
20th-century American male writers
20th-century American non-fiction writers
American male non-fiction writers
United States Navy personnel of World War II